The Curse (also known internationally as The Farm) is a 1987 American science-fiction horror film directed by David Keith in his directorial debut, and based on the short story The Colour Out of Space by H. P. Lovecraft. It tells about a meteorite that crashes into a farming community in Tennessee, which begins to infect the land and its residents. The film stars Wil Wheaton, Claude Akins, Cooper Huckabee, Malcolm Danare, John Schneider, and Amy Wheaton.

Production began in September 1986, in Tellico Plains, Tennessee and Rome. It premiered on September 11, 1987, and was a box-office bomb, grossing $1.9 million against its budget of $4 million. The film would be the first entry into the Curse tetralogy, a series of four films that were retitled for the home video market as a franchise. The retitled sequels includes Curse II: The Bite, Curse III: Blood Sacrifice and Curse IV: The Ultimate Sacrifice.

Plot
Teenage boy Zack lives on a farm in Tellico Plains, Tennessee with his mother Frances, younger sister Alice, stern and pious old stepfather Nathan Crane and unpleasant, dim-witted stepbrother Cyrus. One night Frances sneaks out of the house while Nathan is asleep and begins having sex with Mike, a farm-hand who lives in a nearby shack. Suddenly a large meteorite crashes onto the property, emitting an eerie glow. Next morning, Alan Forbes, a physician who lives nearby, visits the crash-site, examining the meteorite which is a large sphere with a hard shell from which a noxious liquid oozes out. Before long, the object dissolves into glowing gelatinous liquid which seeps into the soil. Forbes wants to contact the authorities but is dissuaded by Charlie Davidson, local realtor and head of the chamber of commerce, who worries that the event will discourage the Tennessee Valley Authority (TVA) from building a new reservoir in the area. Forbes' bored wife Esther also manipulates her husband into keeping quiet, worried their house will lose its value.

The mysterious liquid soon begins to affect the farm. The water from the well grows cloudy and tastes unpleasant, fruit and vegetables grow invitingly large but are rotten and inedible inside and the livestock begin to behave violently and show severe signs of infection. Alice is attacked and injured by infected chickens and Cyrus is nearly killed by a horse. Frances begins to have large boils growing on her face which soon grotesquely alter her features. She becomes mentally unstable, physically harming herself and attacking her own family. Believing the blight affecting his farm to be a punishment from God for his wife's infidelity, Nathan locks her in their bedroom, not allowing Zack to tell the doctor. Zack keeps himself and Alice free from the infection by consuming clean water and food he steals from Forbes' house.

Forbes secretly obtains a sample from the Cranes' well and has it analysed at a nearby lab. The water is found to contain a strange, unknown element which is altering its metabolic properties and molecular structure. Carl Willis, a TVA representative who is surveying the local area for the planned reservoir, enters the Cranes' house looking for a glass of water. Helping himself from the kitchen faucet, he has just started drinking when he is attacked and nearly killed by Frances, who has gone insane and is horribly mutating. Worried that Forbes is going to alert the authorities, Davidson and Esther arrive at the Crane farm looking for the doctor but are attacked by infected dogs who have turned feral. Esther is mauled to death and Davidson hides himself in the cellar only to be killed and seemingly devoured by Frances who had been locked in there by Nathan.  As Nathan and Cyrus examine infected cows in the shed, the cows begin to decay, revealing maggots and worms inside.  The cows explode, covering Nathan and Cyrus in insects.

By now Nathan and Cyrus are also infected and beginning to go insane. A guilt-ridden Forbes enters the house, hoping to rescue Zack and Alice but he is surprised and murdered by Nathan who then barricades the door. Cyrus attacks Alice but Zack fights him off, hiding his sister in a closet. Nathan corners Zack and is about to kill his stepson when he is stabbed by Willis who has just arrived. The ground begins to glow and heave beneath the house which starts to fall apart. Zack locates his mother just in time to see her mutated corpse dissolve into liquid. As Zack prepares to leave, Cyrus attacks him, but Zack knocks him off the balcony, seemingly killing him.  Nathan is knocked out by a support beam as he attempts to stop Zack. Willis gets Zack and Alice out of the house before it collapses and a dying Nathan and Cyrus are both killed by falling debris. Willis drives away from the farm, taking Zack and Alice with him.

Some months later, a heavily-bandaged Willis lies in a hospital bed, having become infected more slowly because he only drank a small amount of the farm's water. He is watching a news report on how authorities are promising that the blight from the farm will be eradicated.

Later, at a location in the nearby countryside, ground and trees begin to heave and break apart at night, revealing more of the glowing alien liquid spreading onto the surface.  A large amount of the substance appears, suggesting that the hostile mutagenic entity is still alive, planning to complete its invasion of Earth.

Cast
 Claude Akins as Nathan Crane
 Cooper Huckabee as Dr. Allen Forbes 
 John Schneider as Carl Willis 
 Malcolm Danare as Cyrus Crane
 Wil Wheaton as Zack Crane
 Amy Wheaton as Alice Crane
 Steve Carlisle as Charlie Davidson 
 Kathleen Jordon Gregory as Frances Crane
 Hope North as Esther Forbes
 Steve Davis as Mike

Production
H. P. Lovecraft's The Colour Out of Space was previously adapted as Die, Monster, Die! in 1965. American International Pictures, who distributed the film in the United States, planned a remake in 1970 with a new screenwriter, but the project never came to fruition.

Principal photography began on September 29, 1986, under the title The Farm, after being announced previously as The Well. David Keith, a native of Knoxville, utilized his farm property in Tellico Plains, Tennessee for the film, while the interiors were shot in Rome. Many of the crew members, who were Italian, were billed under American names, including associate producer Lucio Fulci. Actor Treat Williams was reportedly set to star in the film, but was not involved with the film itself.

Actor Wil Wheaton later wrote on his blog in August 2022 that child labor laws were repeatedly broken on the set and that he and other cast members were endangered and sexually abused during production.

Release
The Curse opened in Los Angeles and New York on September 11, 1987. It earned $1,169,922 from its opening weekend in 326 theaters, and finished grossing $1,930,001 at the box office.

Critical response
Lovecraft scholar Charles P. Mitchell referred to the film as faithful to the author's original work, but claimed that "[t]he last twenty minutes of the film are so disjointed that they virtually ruin the entire film."
 In their book Lurker in the Lobby: A Guide to the Cinema of H. P. Lovecraft, Andrew Migliore and John Strysik write: "This third feature film treatment of [Lovecraft's] favorite story, "The Colour Out of Space", has it all... everything except good dialog, believable acting, and a cohesive plot."

Home video
The Curse was subsequently released on VHS by Media Home Entertainment, as well as on Laserdisc by Image Entertainment, in 1987. It was re-released on VHS by Polygram Video in 1998. On September 9, 2008, Metro-Goldwyn-Mayer released the film and its sequel, Curse II: The Bite, on DVD as a double-feature. Scream Factory, a sub-label of Shout! Factory, released both films as a double-feature on Blu-ray on February 23, 2016.

Soundtrack 
A soundtrack CD was released in 2011 with Franco Micalizzi's score on GDM/Legend Records, along with a 10 minute score suite from Black Demons. The score was not the same as the score in the USA release of the film, making American fans of the film disappointed, which may have led to some returning the CD back to wherever they purchased it from.

Tracklist 

The Curse: 34:31 (44:10 with track 14).

Related works

Sequels
Unlike the first film, its sequels, Curse II: The Bite and Curse III: Blood Sacrifice, were released direct-to-video in 1989 and 1991 respectively. Catacombs (1988) was labeled as Curse IV: The Ultimate Sacrifice for its release on VHS in 1993, despite not being affiliated with the series.

References

External links
 
 

1980s English-language films
1987 independent films
1980s science fiction horror films
1987 films
1987 horror films
American independent films
American science fiction horror films
Films based on horror novels
Films based on short fiction
Films based on works by H. P. Lovecraft
Films set on farms
Films set in Tennessee
Films shot in Tennessee
Films shot in Rome
Films scored by Franco Micalizzi
1987 directorial debut films
Alien invasions in films
1980s American films